Bharam is a 2019 Pakistani television series, produced by Momina Duraid under their banner MD Productions. The drama airs on Hum TV every Monday and Tuesday 9:10pm PST. It stars Noor Zafar Khan and Wahaj Ali in lead roles.

Cast
Noor Khan as Noor Mushtaq/Noor Maarif Ali
Wahaj Ali as RJ Maarif Ali
Mariam Ansari as Warda Waheed/Warda Hammad Burhan
Salma Hassan as Ishrat Mushtaq
Laila Wasti as Farah Burhan
Arslan Asad Butt as Hammad Burhan
Namrah Shahid as Leena Afaaq
Shamyl Khan as Burhan (Dead)
Kinza Malik as Saima Afaaq
Tipu Sharif as Uzaib Afaaq
Mohsin Gillani as Afaaq

References

External links
 Official website

Pakistani drama television series
2019 Pakistani television series debuts
Urdu-language television shows
Hum TV original programming
Hum TV
Pakistani romance television series